The longarmed snake eel (Ophichthus mecopterus) is an eel in the family Ophichthidae (worm/snake eels). It was described by John E. McCosker and Richard Heinrich Rosenblatt in 1998. It is a marine, tropical eel which is known from the eastern central Pacific Ocean, including Mexico, Costa Rica, El Salvador, Guatemala, Nicaragua, and Panama.

The species epithet "mecopterus" means "long fin" in Ancient Greek, and refers to the elongated pectoral fins on the species. Due to its wide distribution in the eastern Pacific, lack of known threats and lack of observed population declines, the IUCN redlist currently lists the Longarmed snake eel as Least Concern.

References

longarmed snake eel
Fish of Mexican Pacific coast
Western Central American coastal fauna
Taxa named by John E. McCosker
Taxa named by Richard Heinrich Rosenblatt
longarmed snake eel